Mayerbukta is a bay in Haakon VII Land at Spitsbergen, Svalbard. It is located at the eastern side of Möllerfjorden, and has a width of about 1.5 kilometers. The glacier of Mayerbreen debouches into the bay. 
The bay is named after Louis Benoit Joseph Mayer, counsellor of Albert I, Prince of Monaco.

References

Bays of Spitsbergen